Pioneer Village is a museum and tourist attraction along U.S. Highway 6 in Minden, Nebraska, United States. The museum has a large collections of items from 1830 to the present, including frontier buildings; early cars (more than 350 are on display) and airplanes; a Wurlitzer Caliola; tractors and other farm implements; and an art collection. The Pioneer Village also manages a motel and a campground as part of the complex.

Gallery

See also
 List of museums in Nebraska
 Nebraska Prairie Museum, located about 20 miles west in Holdrege, Nebraska.
 Hastings Museum, located about 30 miles east in Hastings, Nebraska.

References

External links 

 
 Harold Warp's Pioneer Village, Roadside America
 Family Motor Coach Association - Pioneer Village

Landmarks in Nebraska
U.S. Route 6
Open-air museums in Nebraska
Museums in Kearney County, Nebraska
Transportation museums in Nebraska
History museums in Nebraska
American West museums